Juan Ramón Cabrero Obrer (born 24 April 1980), commonly known as Juanra, is a Spanish professional footballer who plays as a right back.

Football career
Born in Estivella, Valencian Community, Juanra played his first five professional seasons with local Levante UD. He never managed however to appear for them in La Liga, alternating between the first and the second teams, the latter of which competed in the lower leagues.

For 2006–07, Juanra moved to CD Numancia of the second division, going on to establish himself as first-choice during a three-year spell. On 25 June 2009, after suffering relegation from the top level, the 29-year-old signed for Hércules CF also in his native region, playing in 38 games in his debut campaign as the club returned to the top flight after 13 years.

References

External links

1980 births
Living people
People from Camp de Morvedre
Sportspeople from the Province of Valencia
Spanish footballers
Footballers from the Valencian Community
Association football defenders
La Liga players
Segunda División players
Segunda División B players
Tercera División players
Atlético Levante UD players
Levante UD footballers
CD Numancia players
Hércules CF players
CD Castellón footballers